Rupela maenas is a moth in the family Crambidae. It was described by Carl Heinrich in 1937. It is found in the Brazilian state of Paraná and the Guianas.

The wingspan is 22–31 mm. The wings are white.

References

Moths described in 1937
Schoenobiinae
Taxa named by Carl Heinrich